Antonio Missiroli (born 1955) is an Italian researcher, editorialist, lecturer and policy adviser in the European Institutions. A polyglot, Missiroli is fluent in Italian, English, French and German.

He has written articles and books on EU Foreign and Security Policy, EU Enlargement, EU Institutions and Comparative Politics.

He was the Director of the European Union Institute for Security Studies from mid-October 2012 to December 2017.

As from January 2018 he is NATO Assistant Secretary General for Emerging Security Challenges.

Biography 
Missiroli gained his Master's degree in International Public Policy from Johns Hopkins University SAIS Bologna in 1993, and his Ph.D. in Contemporary History from the Scuola Normale Superiore (Pisa) in 1997.

He was a professional journalist (corresponding from Germany during unification for "L'Indipendente", an Italian daily) and commentator on EU and international affairs.

Missiroli has lectured in several subjects at various universities (European politics at the University of Bath, European security at the university of Trento, transatlantic security at Boston University, and European Foreign Policy at the School of Advanced International Studies of Johns Hopkins University. He has also spent time as Visiting Fellow at St Antony's College, Oxford (1996–1997).
Before joining the Bureau of European Policy Advisers, he acted as Head of European Studies at CeSPI in Rome (1994–1997), as Research Fellow at the W/EU Institute for Security Studies in Paris (1998–2005) and as Director of Studies at the European Policy Centre in Brussels (2005–2010). He currently teaches a course called "The EU and NATO: emerging security challenges" at Sciences Po Lille.

He worked in the Bureau of European Policy Advisers of the European Commission as the Head of the European Dialogue from 2010 to mid October 2012.

Publications 
 Include books and papers on contemporary Germany, CFSP and ESDP, EU institutions, political opposition, Scandinavia, Central Europe, and Italian foreign policy.
Among his latest ones:
 BEPA monthly (editor) 2010 and 2011 BEPA monthly
 Italy’s security and defence policy: between EU and US, or just Prodi and Berlusconi?, “Journal of Southern Europe and the Balkans”, 2/2007
 The EU Foreign Service (editor), EPC Working Paper, 28/2007
 La difesa europea, Il Melangolo, Genova, 2007 (with Alessandro Pansa)
 Disasters, Diseases, Disruptions: A new D-Drive for the EU (editor), EU-ISS, Paris, 2005
 Central Europe between the EU and NATO, “Survival”, Winter 2004/05

Missiroli articles 
 Aspenia online contributions of Dr. Antonio Missiroli from Apr 2009 to Jul 2010
 With help Brussels could become an ideas hub, 8 Apr 2010
 NATO and the EU: what a difference a decade makes, 25 Jul 2009
 Europe Needs Its Own Security Council, 5 Feb 2004

Others 
 BEPA website
 BEPA monthly
 Johns Hopkins University

References

External links
 Statement by the spokesperson of High Representative Catherine Ashton on the appointment of a new Director of the EU Institute for Security Studies
 Director of EUISS named
 Adjunct professor of European Studies at Johns Hopkins University

Italian journalists
Italian male journalists
Living people
1955 births
European Commission